The Taiwan missile crisis may refer to:
 First Taiwan Strait Crisis, also known as the 1955 Taiwan Strait Crisis
 Second Taiwan Strait Crisis, also known as the 1958 Taiwan Strait Crisis
 Third Taiwan Strait Crisis, also known as the 1996 Taiwan Strait Crisis